The following is a list of squads for all 12 national teams that competed at the 2019 Copa América. Each national team had to submit a final squad of 23 players, 3 of whom had to be goalkeepers.

On 31 May 2019 CONMEBOL published the lists of the twelve teams.

Group A

Brazil
Head coach: Tite

The 23-man squad was announced on 17 May 2019. On 6 June, Neymar withdrew due to an injury and was replaced by Willian.

Bolivia
Head coach: Eduardo Villegas

The 31-man provisional squad was released on 15 May 2019. The 23-man final squad was announced on 31 May 2019. On 11 June, forward Rodrigo Ramallo withdrew injured and was replaced by Ramiro Vaca.

Venezuela
Head coach: Rafael Dudamel

The 40-man provisional squad was announced on 10 May 2019. The 23-man final squad was announced on 30 May 2019. On 8 June, midfielder Adalberto Peñaranda was ruled out due to an injury and was replaced by Yeferson Soteldo.

Peru
Head coach:  Ricardo Gareca

The 40-man provisional squad was announced on 15 May 2019. The 23-man final squad was announced on 30 May 2019. On 11 June, Paolo Hurtado was ruled out due to injury and replaced by Josepmir Ballón.

Group B

Argentina
Head coach: Lionel Scaloni

The 40-man provisional squad was released on 15 May 2019. The 23-man final squad was announced on 20 May 2019. On 3 June midfielder Exequiel Palacios was replaced by Guido Pizarro due to injury. On 14 June goalkeeper Esteban Andrada was replaced by Juan Musso due to injury.

Colombia
Head coach:  Carlos Queiroz

The 40-man provisional squad was announced on 15 May 2019. On 20 May, defender Luis Manuel Orejuela was replaced by Stefan Medina due to injury. The 23-man final squad was announced on 30 May 2019.

Paraguay
Head coach:  Eduardo Berizzo

The 40-man provisional squad was announced on 13 May 2019. Provisional squad was reduced to 39 players on 17 May after Roque Santa Cruz withdrew injured. The 23-man final squad was announced on 29 May 2019. On 10 June, midfielder Richard Ortiz was ruled out due to an injury and replaced by Richard Sánchez.

Qatar
Head coach:  Félix Sánchez

The 23-man final squad was announced on 30 May 2019.

Group C

Uruguay
Head coach: Óscar Tabárez

The 23-man final squad was announced on 30 May 2019.

Ecuador
Head coach:  Hernán Darío Gómez

The 40-man provisional squad was released on 17 May 2019. The 23-man final squad was released on 20 May 2019.

Japan
Head coach: Hajime Moriyasu

The 23-men squad was released on 24 May 2019.

Chile
Head coach:  Reinaldo Rueda

The 23-man squad was released on 26 May 2019.

Statistics

Age
All ages are set to 14 June 2019, the opening day of the tournament.

Players
Oldest:  Eiji Kawashima
Youngest:  Takefusa Kubo

Goalkeepers
Oldest:  Eiji Kawashima
Youngest:  Keisuke Osako

Captains
Oldest:  Dani Alves
Youngest:  Gustavo Gómez

Player representation

By club
Clubs are ordered alphabetically: first by country, then by club name.

By club nationality
Nations in bold are represented by their national teams in the tournament.

By club confederation
Nations in bold are represented by their national teams in the tournament.

References

Copa América squads
squads